Sail Away is the seventh studio album by the American hard rock band Great White, released in 1994. It was a much mellower effort, dominated by acoustic guitars and laid back performances. Clarence Clemons of the E Street Band plays the sax solo on "Gone with the Wind".  This is the band's first and only recording with bassist Teddy Cook, as well as their first release for Zoo Entertainment. The original issue came with a bonus CD entitled Anaheim Live. Though these CD's state that the bonus disc was part of a limited edition pressing, no other pressings on CD were made without Anaheim Live, likely because of the poor sales of the album.

Track listing

Anaheim Live track listing 
Recorded on the Westwood One Mobile, July 24, 1993, at the Celebrity Theatre in Anaheim, California.
Engineered by Biff Dawes, Doug Field, Phillip Kneebone & Dennis Mays.

Personnel

Great White 
Jack Russell – lead and backing vocals
Mark Kendall – lead guitar, backing vocals
Michael Lardie – rhythm guitar, banjo, sitar, keyboards, backing vocals, percussion, producer, arranger, engineer
Teddy Cook – bass, third guitar, backing vocals
Audie Desbrow – drums

Additional musicians 
Alan Niven – additional guitars, backing vocals, percussion, producer, arranger
Clarence Clemons – saxophone on "Gone with the Wind"
Suzie Katayama – cello

Production 
Biff Dawes, Doug Field, Jared Johnson, Philip Kneebone, Dennis Mays – engineers
George Marino – mastering

Charts

Album

Singles 
Sail Away

References 

Great White albums
1994 albums
Zoo Entertainment (record label) albums